

Countess of Étampes

House of Évreux, 1327–1381

House of Valois-Anjou, 1381–1384 

vacant

House of Valois-Berry, 1399–1416 

vacant, to royal domain

House of Montfort, 1421–1478 

disputed with the Countess of Nevers and Duchess of Burgundy

House of Foix, 1478–1512

Duchess of Étampes

House of Brosse

House of Poitiers 
None

House of Brosse 

to royal domain

House of Palatinate-Simmern 

to royal domain

House of Guise 
None

House of Valois-Angoulême 
None

House of Bourbon-Vendôme

House of Orléans 

The title has not been reused in the d'Orléans family

See also 
Countess of Évreux
Duchess of Penthièvre
Duchess of Vendôme
List of consorts of Nevers
List of consorts of Burgundy

 
 
Etampes
Etampes
Etampes, List of royal consorts of